Sasha Alexander (born Suzana Drobnjakovic  on May 17, 1973), is an American actress and TV director. She played Gretchen Witter in Dawson's Creek and has acted in films including Yes Man (2008) and He's Just Not That Into You (2009). Alexander played Caitlin Todd for the first two seasons of NCIS (2003–2005). From July 2010 through September 2016, Alexander starred as Maura Isles in the TNT series Rizzoli & Isles and was a regular in Season 5 and 6 of Shameless in 2015-2016.

Early life 
Alexander, who is of Serbian descent, was born Suzana Drobnjakovic in Los Angeles, California. She began acting in school productions in the seventh grade. She was also an ice skater, but stopped due to a knee injury. She continued acting through high school and college, then moved to New York City to act in summer stock and Shakespeare festivals. She graduated from the University of Southern California's School of Cinema-Television, where she was a member of the sorority Kappa Alpha Theta.

Career 
Alexander got her acting start on two short-lived series: the medical drama Presidio Med and ABC's twenty-something drama Wasteland. She achieved widespread media attention and critical praise when she appeared in the fourth season of Dawson's Creek as Gretchen Witter, the sister of Pacey Witter, and dated the title character. Alexander was also in an episode of the short-lived Fox comedy series Greg the Bunny, in which she played the role of a lesbian TV Guide reporter and shared an onscreen kiss with Sarah Silverman.

Alexander appeared in the films Lucky 13 and All Over the Guy, as well as He's Just Not That Into You (in the role of Catherine), the independent movie The Last Lullaby, and Yes Man (as Lucy) starring Jim Carrey. She appeared as District Attorney Robin Childs in the CSI episode "Alter Boys", and she appeared in an episode of Friends ("The One with Joey's Interview"), playing a Soap Opera Digest reporter who interviewed Joey.

Alexander joined NCIS as Secret Service/NCIS Special Agent Caitlin "Kate" Todd in 2003. Her character replaced Vivian Blackadder, played by Robyn Lively, who had appeared in the backdoor pilot episodes "Ice Queen" and "Meltdown" on JAG. The official pilot episode "Yankee White" aired September 23, 2003, on CBS. Alexander's two year tenure on the show ended in May 2005 when her character, Kate, is killed by a terrorist who shoots her in the head during the last few seconds of the season-two finale, "Twilight".

The official explanation for the her departure was that "she asked to be let out of her contract to pursue other opportunities". In statements made by Alexander since her departure from NCIS, she has made clear that her problem with the show was that she felt the workload was too physically demanding for her.

In subsequent television series work, episode counts were considerably smaller, and her character portrayals required less physical effort than her role on NCIS. In her final appearances in the two-part episode "Kill Ari", Alexander was credited as a special guest star. Her character Caitlin Todd reappeared in a "what if" scenario with Anthony DiNozzo for the NCIS 200th episode "Life Before His Eyes" in 2012, however, Alexander did not return to film new footage for the episode; rather footage from the second season episode "SWAK" was recut to incorporate her into the new episode.

She also had a small role in 2006's Mission: Impossible III. She joined the cast of The Nine in the role of Nick's ex-wife.

From 2010 to 2016, Alexander played Dr. Maura Isles for seven seasons on the TNT series Rizzoli & Isles – the Commonwealth of Massachusetts' Chief Medical Examiner, who works with the Boston Police Department. Alexander costarred with Angie Harmon, who played Boston Homicide Detective Jane Rizzoli, Isles's best friend on the show.

In 2015, Alexander began a recurring role on Showtime's Shameless portraying Helene Runyon, one of Lip Gallagher's college professors. Her character Helene maintains an open relationship with her husband Theo (played by Michael Reilly Burke) which allows her to sleep with Lip. The relationship between Helene and Lip is both romantic and one which provides him with guidance in his college career, but the affair blows-up in season six (2016).

Alexander was cast opposite Ludacris in the 2018 drama film The Ride. In 2018, Alexander guest-starred in the Law & Order: Special Victims Unit episode, "Caretaker" (season 20, episode 8), as villainess Anna Mill. Alexander played Detective Chesler in the 2020 Netflix film, Dangerous Lies.

Since 2020, she has voiced Addie in the animated web-series Deathstroke: Knights & Dragons, based on DC Comics.

In 2021, Alexander directed the 9th episode "Red flags" of season 3 of the Netflix show You.

Personal life 
On September 18, 1999, Alexander married Luka Pecel, but this marriage later ended by summary dissolution in California.

Alexander is married to director Edoardo Ponti (the younger son of actress Sophia Loren and film producer Carlo Ponti). They have two children, a daughter Lucia and a son Leonardo. Jessica Capshaw is godmother to Lucia. Alexander speaks English, Serbian, Italian, and some French.

Filmography

Film

Television

As Actress

As director

As producer

Accolades

References

External links 

 
 
 

1973 births
20th-century American actresses
21st-century American actresses
Actresses from Los Angeles
American film actresses
American people of Serbian descent
American television actresses
Living people
USC School of Cinematic Arts alumni